Gabriel Vasquez (Belmonte, Cuenca, 1549 or 1551 – Alcalá de Henares, 23 September 1604) was a Spanish Jesuit theologian.

Life
He made his primary and grammar studies at Belmonte, and went to Alcalá for philosophy, where he entered the Society of Jesus on 9 April 1569. Having completed his novitiate he continued his theological studies there, closing with a public defense of his thesis.

At the Fifth Provincial Congregation at Toledo he also defended a thesis. Between these events he lectured to the Jesuit students on the De Anima, and returned to Alcalá to study Hebrew.

Following this he taught moral theology two years at the college of Ocaña, two more at Madrid, and for some time at Alcalá. From there, although not yet thirty years of age, he was called to Rome to fill the same post at the Roman College. Before his departure he made his profession at Belmonte.

He remained six years in Rome then returned to Alcalá, where he taught theology until his death. In him, according to the 19th-century German Redemptorist writer Michael Haringer, virtue competed with doctrine, obedience with genius, and piety with learning. The Duke of Lerma, favourite of Philip III of Spain, frequently consulted him in the most important matters, and Benedict XIV called him the luminary of theology.

He was noted for his exact knowledge of the opinions and theories of the different Schools and authors, and commendable for clearness of expression and a strict philosophical method. He made a complete study of the writings of St. Augustine, for whom he professed great devotion, as well as those of the other Fathers of the Church and St. Thomas.

In matters of opinion he sometimes differed from the mainstream scholastic views, defending private opinions, among which the following deserve to be mentioned:

The natural law consists in rational nature considered in itself and in the recognition that certain actions are necessarily in accord with it and others are repugnant to it. Nevertheless, he does not deny that the natural law might also have cognizance of what the Divine law enjoins, and that it might, therefore, be the principle of a Divine obligation. In this he is in opposition to Kant, who holds that all the binding force of the moral law should come from man and from man alone.
The Divine ideas are not the essence of God, insofar as that essence or nature is known as imitable or to be imitated, but only as they are the knowledge, the word, the species expressa of possible and future creatures. These ideas thereby concur remotely in the creation of beings; their proximate principle being the Divine active potency by which God actually and effectually creates.
In the section dedicated to the discussion of the existence of God he cites the ontological proof of St. Anselm, the legitimateness and demonstrative value of which he appears to accept absolutely. Eternity is, according to him, duratio permanens, uniformis, sine principio et fine, mensura carens, a definition that differs somewhat from that adopted by Boethius and followed in the Schools.
Grace is necessary for performing all good actions and overcoming temptation. By grace he understands all good impulses which efficaciously urge to right action. It may proceed from natural causes, but as these are regulated by Divine Providence, if they are so regulated as to produce efficacious good impulses, it is grace, because man does not himself merit it, and to many it is denied. It is to be considered as a gift from God, since it is granted through the merits of Christ and for a supernatural end. Hence it is called grace.
Predestination, he maintains, is post praevisa merita, but children who die without its being in any way whatsoever possible for them to receive baptism were not, after original sin was foreseen, included in the salvific will of God.
In Christology he held the following opinions: that the Adoptionists are not Nestorians; that Christ cannot be called the servant of God; that Christ was under a command to die, but that He was free to choose the circumstances of his death; that the regular or formal dignity of the priesthood of Christ will last forever, because Christ is a priest according to His substance, and this remains immutable.
The ratio formalis of the Sacrifice of the Mass lies in the mystic separation of the Body and Blood of Christ effected by the words of consecration.
It is probable that in the new birth of baptism the guilt of sin is not pardoned ex opere operato, but only the punishment. Since the death of Christ, baptism is for children the only means of salvation; for them martyrdom has the virtue of justification instar baptism; but in adults it justifies only on account of the act of charity.
Episcopal consecration does not imprint a new character, nor does it in reality extend or increase the sacerdotal character; a new and distinct power is thereby conferred, which is nothing else than the Divine appointment to a new ministry.
In the Sacrament of Matrimony the bodies of the contracting parties constitute the matter, and their consent, expressed verbally or by signs, the form.
In treating the existence of God he notes the number of atheists who lived in his time, and attributes it to the influence of Protestantism. He also mentions the political atheists who consider God and religion only as governmental expedients to hold the people in check.

Vasquez was a rival of Francisco Suárez, whom he sometimes designates as one of the moderns. He established a School, and the disputes between his disciples and those of the Dominican John of St. Thomas concerning the Divine knowledge and the Divine idea were, according to Menéndez y Pelayo, curious. Luis de Torres and Diego de Alarcon were the most notable disciples of the School, and, although it was short-lived, modern theologians frequently quote him.

Works
"De cultu adorationis libri tres et disputationes duae contra errores Felicis et Elipandi", Alcalá, 1594; Mainz, 1601, 1604.
"Commentariorum ac Disputationum in (partes) S. Thomae", Alcalá, 8 vols., 1598–1615. Later abridged editions were published at Alcalá, Ingolstadt, Vienna, and more complete ones at Lyons in 1620 and Antwerp in 1621.
"Paraphrases et compendiaria explicatio ad nonnullas Pauli Epistolas", Alcalá, 1612; Ingolstadt, 1613; Lyons, 1630. Vives undertook to print all his works, but got only as far as the first volume (Paris, 1905).
"Disputationes metaphysicae desumptae ex variis locis suorum operum" (Madrid, 1617; Antwerp, 1618) compiled by Francisco Murcia de la Llana, comprises the philosophical questions dispersed throughout his works, and is a rare and exceptionally valuable book.

Some of his manuscripts are preserved in the National Library of Madrid.

His first volume on the first part of St. Thomas was held back two years by the censors of the Society. Among the questions he discussed are: "An Deus extra coelum, vel in vacuo intra coelum esse possit, aut ante mundi creationem alicubi fuerit". Nicolás Antonio called him vir fuit acerrimo ingenio.

References

Sources 
Juan Eusebio Nieremberg y Otin, Varones ilustres de la Compañía de Jesús, VIII (Bilbao, 1891), 355
François Elesban de Guilhermy, Ménologe de la Compagnie de Jésus, Assistance d'Espagne, III (Paris, 1902), 111
Southwell, Bibl. Script. (Rome, 1676), 271
Zeferino González, Historia de la Filosofía , III (Madrid, 1866), 140
Marcelino Menéndez y Pelayo, Historia de las ideas estéticas en España, II (Madrid, 1884), 207
Carlos Sommervogel, Bibliothèque de la Compagnie de Jésus, VIII (Brussels, 1898), 513.

External links

The Birth of Ontology. A selection of Ontologists from 1560 to 1770

1604 deaths
Catholic casuists
16th-century Spanish Jesuits
16th-century Spanish Roman Catholic theologians
16th-century male writers
Year of birth uncertain
1549 births
Jesuit theologians